The 1999–2000 Louisiana–Lafayette Ragin' Cajuns men's basketball team represented the University of Louisiana at Lafayette during the 1999–2000 NCAA Division I men's basketball season. The Ragin' Cajuns, led by third-year head coach Jessie Evans, played their home games at the Cajundome and were members of the Sun Belt Conference. They finished the season 25–9, 13–3 in Sun Belt play to finish in second place. They were champions of the Sun Belt Conference tournament to earn an automatic bid to the NCAA tournament where they lost in the first round to Tennessee.

Roster

Schedule and results

|-
!colspan=9 style=| Regular season

|-
!colspan=9 style=| Sun Belt tournament

|-
!colspan=9 style=| NCAA tournament

References

Louisiana Ragin' Cajuns men's basketball seasons
Louisiana-Lafayette
Louisiana-Lafayette
Louisiana
Louisiana